Motoujina-guchi is a Hiroden station (tram stop) on Hiroden Ujina Line, located in Minami-ku, Hiroshima.

Routes
From Motoujina-guchi Station, there are three of Hiroden Streetcar routes.

 Hiroshima Station - Hiroshima Port Route
 Hiroden-nishi-hiroshima - Hiroshima Port Route
 Hiroshima Station - (via Hijiyama-shita) - Hiroshima Port Route

Connections
█ Ujina Line
  
Kaigan-dori — Motoujina-guchi — Hiroshima Port

Around station
Moto-Ujina Park
Hiroshima Minato Park

History
Opened as "Mukōujina-guchi" on April 3, 1915.
Moved and renamed to "2-chome-ura" in 1929.
Renamed to "Mukōujina" as the terminal stop on December 27, 1935.
Renamed to "Mukōujina-guchi".
Renamed to the present name "Motoujina-guchi" on November 1, 2001.

See also
Hiroden Streetcar Lines and Routes
List of railway stations in Japan

References

Motoujina-guchi Station
Railway stations in Japan opened in 1915